Firearms produced by the Winchester Repeating Arms Company (later Winchester-Western Company and U.S. Repeating Arms Company), 1866–2006, by model:

Year-model numbers 1866-1912 
Model 1866 lever-action rimfire (later centerfire) rifle
Model 1873 lever-action centerfire rifle
Model 1876 lever-action centerfire rifle
Model 1878 Hotchkiss bolt-action rifle (US Army and Navy)
Model 1885 falling-block single-shot rifle
Model 1886 lever-action centerfire rifle
Model 1887 lever-action shotgun
Model 1890 slide-action .22 WRF rifle
Model 1892 lever-action centerfire rifle
Model 1893 slide-action shotgun
Model 1894 lever-action centerfire rifle
Model 1895 lever-action centerfire box-magazine rifle
Model 1895 Lee bolt-action rifle (US Navy/Marine Corps)
Model 1897 slide-action shotgun (Model 1893 variant)
Model 1900 bolt-action single-shot .22 rifle
Model 1901 lever-action shotgun (Model 1887 variant)
Model 1902 bolt-action single-shot .22 rifle (Model 1900 variant)
Model 1903 semi-automatic .22 Win Auto rifle
Model 1904 bolt-action single-shot .22 rifle (Model 1900 variant)
Model 99 "Thumb Trigger" single-shot .22 rifle
Model 1905 semi-automatic centerfire rifle
Model 1906 slide-action .22 WRF rifle (Model 1890 variant)
Model 1907 semi-automatic centerfire rifle (Model 1905 variant)
Model 1910 semi-automatic centerfire rifle (Model 1905 variant)
Model 1911 SL semi-automatic shotgun
Model 1912 slide-action shotgun

Sequential Model Numbers (Rifles) 1919-39 
In 1919 Winchester abandoned numbering models by the year of introduction and assigned two-digit numbers, sequential beginning with 51 for rifles.  Older guns still in production had their model numbers truncated, e.g. the Model 1912 shotgun became the Model 12. There was one exception: the unconventional "Thumb Trigger" rifle, which was not previously numbered, was given the designation 99.
Model 51 "Imperial" (1919) bolt-action rifle
Model 52 (1920) bolt-action .22 match rifle
Model 53 (1924) lever-action rifle (Model 92 variant)
Model 54 (1925) bolt-action rifle
Model 55 (1924) lever-action rifle (Model 94 variant)
Model 56 (1926) bolt-action .22 rifle
Model 57 (1926) bolt-action .22 target rifle (Model 56 target variant)
Model 58 (1928) bolt-action single-shot .22 rifle
Model 59 (1930) bolt-action single-shot .22 rifle (Model 58 target variant)
Model 60 (1930) bolt-action .22 rifle (Model 58 variant)
Model 60A (1933) bolt-action .22 single shot rifle (Model 58 variant)
 Available in standard and target models
Model 61 (1932) slide-action .22 WCF (later .22 rimfire and .22 WMR) rifle
Model 62 (1932) slide-action .22 rifle (Model 90 variant)
Model 62A (1940) slide-action .22 rifle (Model 90 variant)
Model 63 (1933) semi-automatic .22 rifle (Model 03 variant)
Model 64 (1933) lever-action rifle (Model 94 variant)
Model 65 (1933) lever-action rifle (Model 92 variant)
Model 67 (1934) bolt-action .22 rifle
Model 677 (1937) bolt-action .22 rifle (telescopic-sight-only Model 67 variant)
Model 68 (1934) bolt-action .22 rifle (Model 67 variant)
Model 69 (1935) bolt-action .22 rifle
Model 697 (1937) bolt-action .22 rifle (telescopic-sight-only Model 69 variant)
Model 70 (1936) bolt-action rifle
Model 71 (1935) lever-action rifle (Model 86 variant)
Model 72 (1938) bolt-action .22 rifle
Model 74 (1939) semi-automatic .22 rifle
Model 75 (1938) bolt-action .22 target rifle

Non-sequential model numbers (rifles) 1949-63 
Model 43 (1949) bolt-action rifle
Model 47 (1949) bolt-action single-shot .22 rifle
Model 55 (1957) semi-automatic single-shot .22 rifle
Model 77 (1955) semi-automatic .22 rifle
Model 88 (1955) hybrid lever-action rifle
Model 100 (1960) semi-automatic rifle
Model 250 (1963) lever-action .22 rifle
Model 270 (1963) slide-action .22 rifle
Model 290 (1963) semi-automatic .22 rifle

Non-sequential model numbers 
Model 121 (1967) bolt-action single shot .22 rifle
Model 131 (1967) bolt-action .22 rifle (repeating Model 121 variant, box magazine)
Model 141 (1967) bolt-action .22 rifle (repeating Model 121 variant), butt stock tube fed rifle. 
Model 150 (1967) lever-action .22 rifle (Model 250 variant)
Model 190 (1966) semi-automatic .22 rifle
Model 255 (1964) lever-action .22 WMR rifle (Model 250 variant)
Model 310 (1972) single shot .22 rifle
Model 320 (1972) bolt-action .22 rifle 5 or 10 round box magazine 
Model 325 (1972) bolt-action .22 WMR rifle (Model 320 variant)
Model 490 (1975) semi-automatic .22 rifle
Model 670 (1966) bolt-action rifle
Model 770 (1969) bolt-action rifle
Model 9422 (1972) lever-action .22 rifle

Model numbers (shotguns) 1919-63 
Model 20 (1920) single-shot shotgun
Model 21 (1931) double-barrel shotgun
Model 24 (1939) double-barrel shotgun
Model 25 (1949) slide-action shotgun (Model 12 variant)
Model 36 (1919) single-shot 9mm rimfire shotgun (Garden Gun) (Model 1900 variant)
Model 37 (1936) single-shot shotgun
Model 40 (1939) semi-automatic shotgun
Model 41 (1920) bolt-action single-shot .410-bore shotgun
Model 42 (1933) slide-action .410-bore shotgun (Model 12 variant)
Model 50 (1954) semi-automatic shotgun
Model 59 (1960) semi-automatic shotgun
Model 101 (1963) over/under shotgun

Model numbers (shotguns) 1964-2006 
Model 23 (1978) double-barrel shotgun
Model 37A (1973) single-shot shotgun (Model 37 variant)
Model 96 (1976) over/under shotgun
Model 370 (1972) single-shot shotgun (Model 37 variant)
Model 1200 (1964) slide-action shotgun (Model 12 replacement)

(Model 1200 variant)
Model 1400 (1964) semi-automatic shotgun
Model 1500 (1978) semi-automatic shotgun (Model 1400 variant)
The Winchester 1300 shotgun was first introduced in around 1981, when the US Repeating Arms Company (USRAC) took over production of the 'Winchester' brand guns from the Olin / Winchester corporation. 
Model 9410 (2001) lever-action .410-bore shotgun (Model 94 variant)
Super-X Model 1 (1974) semi-automatic shotgun

See also
Winchester rifle
Winchester Repeating Arms Company

Notes

Bibliography 
Houze, Herbert G. To the dreams of youth: Winchester .22 Caliber Single Shot Rifle. Iola, WI, USA: Krause Publications, Inc. 1993.

External links 
 Interesting Article On The Evolution Of The Winchester Rifle. Good Photos.

Winchester
Winchester

Rifles of the United States
Winchester models, List of|Winchester